The Middleton Times-Tribune is a weekly community newspaper in Middleton, Dane County, Wisconsin. 

It is published every Thursday by News Publishing Company, Inc. The Times-Tribune covers local politics, entertainment and sports in the city of Middleton, and the towns of Middleton, Westport, and Springfield.

External links
Middleton Times-Tribune website

Newspapers published in Wisconsin
Middleton, Wisconsin